Monosyntaxis montanus is a moth of the family Erebidae. It was described by Schulze in 1910. It is found on Luzon in the Philippines.

References

Lithosiina
Moths described in 1910